Tulucay may refer to:
Rancho Tulucay
Tuluka, California